Bayon Television (Bayon TV) is a Cambodian free-to-air television network. Bayon TV broadcasts from 06:00 to midnight.

History 
It was launched in 1998 by Hun Mana, oldest daughter of prime minister Hun Sen. It is the second private television station and the first UHF channel in Cambodia.

Brand

Logo history

Theme song

Cambodian national anthem

See also
List of television stations in Cambodia
Media of Cambodia

References

External links
 Official website 

Television stations in Cambodia
Mass media in Phnom Penh